Marne-la-Vallée –  Chessy also appearing on platform displays as Marne-la-Vallée Chessy - Parcs Disneyland, is a large combined RER (commuter rail), and high-speed rail station in Chessy, Seine-et-Marne, France, about  east of Paris, located on the LGV Interconnexion Est opened in 1994. The station is inside the Disneyland Paris resort, close to the entrances to the theme parks and at the entrance to Disney Village. The station opened as an extension of RER A in April 1992, in conjunction with the opening of the theme park, with The Walt Disney Company contributing €38.1 million of the €126.5 million cost. The high-speed rail part of the station opened in May 1994, two years after the RER portion of station.

Situation

There are direct TGV services to, among others, Bordeaux, Marseille, Nice, Lyon, Rennes, Lille, Nantes, Limoges, Toulouse, Montpellier, Orléans, Grenoble and Brussels. On 29 June 1996, Eurostar began direct services from London Waterloo. Marne-la-Vallée–Chessy is also the rail head used for Paris by Ouigo services. Passengers can travel by TGV from Charles de Gaulle Airport TGV station to this station in less than 10 minutes.

The station has a UK National Rail station code of MCK because it is part of the Eurostar network, although Eurostar is not part of National Rail. As Marne-la-Vallée – Chessy is a Eurostar station, it houses Eurostar check-in areas and border control booths operated by the French Border Police and Customs in a dedicated area on the 2nd floor of the station. Previously, the UK Border Agency operated juxtaposed controls and carried out pre-embarkation immigration checks at the station. However, the UK has discontinued this arrangement. Accordingly, passengers go through UK immigration and customs checks at their arrival station in the UK.

Train services
From Marne-la-Vallée–Chessy, train services depart to major French cities such as Lyon, Marseille, Nice, Montpellier, Perpignan, Lille and Strasbourg. International services operate to Brussels in Belgium, London in the United Kingdom and Amsterdam in the Netherlands.

The following services currently start, end, or stop at Marne-la-Vallée–Chessy:

Domestic services:
High-speed services (TGV) from Lille Europe to Marne-la-Vallée–Chessy, Lyon Saint-Exupéry, Avignon TGV and Marseille-Saint-Charles, Cannes and Nice
High-speed services (TGV) from Lille Europe to Marne-la-Vallée–Chessy, Lyon Saint-Expuéry, Nîmes, Montpellier-Saint-Roch and Toulouse
High-speed services (TGV) from Lille Europe to Marne-la-Vallée–Chessy, Tours-Saint-Pierre-des-Corps, Angoulême and Bordeaux-Saint-Jean
High-speed services (TGV) from Lille Europe to Marne-la-Vallée–Chessy, Le Mans and Rennes
High-speed services (TGV) from Lille Europe to Marne-la-Vallée–Chessy, Le Mans, Angers and Nantes
High-speed services (TGV) from Lille Europe to Arras, Marne-la-Vallée–Chessy, Lyon Saint-Exupéry, Nîmes and Montpellier-Saint-Roch
High-speed services (TGV) from Lille Europe to Arras, Marne-la-Vallée–Chessy, Lyon Saint-Exupéry, Avignon TGV and Marseille-Saint-Charles
High-speed services (TGV) from Strasbourg to Marne-la-Vallée–Chessy, Le Mans and Rennes
High-speed services (TGV) from Strasbourg to Marne-la-Vallée–Chessy, Le Mans, Angers and Nantes
High-speed services (TGV) from Strasbourg to Marne-la-Vallée–Chessy, Tours-Saint-Pierre-des-Corps and Bordeaux-Saint-Jean

High-speed services (Ouigo) from Marne-la-Vallée–Chessy to Lyon Saint-Exupéry, Avignon TGV and Marseille-Saint-Charles
High-speed services (Ouigo) from Marne-la-Vallée–Chessy to Lyon Saint-Exupéry, Nîmes and Montpellier-Saint-Roch

International services:
High-speed services (TGV) from Brussels-South to Lille Europe, Marne-la-Vallée–Chessy, Lyon Saint-Exupéry, Avignon TGV and Marseille-Saint-Charles
High-speed services (TGV) from Brussels-South to Lille Europe, Marne-la-Vallée–Chessy, Lyon Saint-Exupéry, Nîmes, Montpellier-Saint-Roch and Perpignan
High-speed services (Eurostar) from Marne-la-Vallée–Chessy to London St. Pancras (until 5 June 2023)
High-speed services (Thalys) from Marne-la-Vallée–Chessy to Brussels-South, Rotterdam Centraal and Amsterdam Centraal

Commuter services:
RER services (A) from Cergy-le-Haut, Conflans-Fin-d'Oise, Sartrouville, La Défense, Gare de Lyon, Vincennes, Val de Fontenay and Marne-la-Vallée–Chessy
RER services (A) from Poissy to Sartrouville, La Défense, Gare de Lyon, Vincennes, Val de Fontenay and Marne-la-Vallée–Chessy

See also

List of stations of the Paris RER
Rail transport in Walt Disney Parks and Resorts

References

External links 

 

Réseau Express Régional stations
Railway stations in Seine-et-Marne
Railway stations in France opened in 1992
Disneyland Paris
Rail transport in Walt Disney Parks and Resorts
Railway stations served by Eurostar
Railways of amusement parks in France
French railway stations with juxtaposed controls